"A Sentimental Journey" is the nineteenth episode of the 1969 ITC British television series Randall and Hopkirk (Deceased) starring Mike Pratt and Kenneth Cope. The episode was first broadcast on 23 January 1970 on the ITV. It was directed by Leslie Norman. In this episode Marty learns to search every hotel room in London quickly and is able to blow an entire small aircraft across the runway.
Annette Andre does not appear in this episode. The absence of Jeannie Hopkirk, as per her non-appearance in "When the Spirit Moves You" is not explained in this episode. Also as per "When the Spirit Moves You", Andre does receive a credit at the end of this episode as well, despite her non-appearance.

Synopsis

Production
Although the 19th episode in the series, A Sentimental Journey was the 4th episode to be shot, filmed in July–August 1968.

Cast
Mike Pratt as Jeff Randall
Kenneth Cope as Marty Hopkirk
Annette Andre as Jeannie Hopkirk
William Squire ....  Sam Seymour
Tracey Crisp ....  Dandy Garrison
Drewe Henley ....  Tony
Victor Maddern ....  Detective Sergeant Watts
Antony Baird ....  Hamilton
John Rae ....  Alexander
Larry Taylor ....  Man in Phone Booth
Michael Bird ....  Sleeping Car Attendant
Billy Cornelius ....  Albert

References

External links

Episode overview at Randallandhopkirk.org.uk
Filming locations at Randallandhopkirk.org.uk

Randall and Hopkirk (Deceased) episodes
1970 British television episodes